Allington is a village and civil parish in Dorset, England,  north-west from the town of Bridport, with which it is physically contiguous; much of Allington lies within Bridport parish. In the 2011 census Allington civil parish had 371 dwellings, 339 households and a population of 766.

The hill is characteristic of the Upper Greensand hills and ridges found in the Marshwood and Powerstock Vales National Character Area.

In 1086 in the Domesday Book Allington was recorded as Adelingtone; it had 21 households, 3 ploughlands,  of meadow and one mill. It was in Goderthorn Hundred and the lord and tenant-in-chief was Turstin son of Rolf.

The parish church at North Allington, dedicated to St Swithun, was designed by Charles Wallis of Dorchester and built in 1826–27, and is a Grade II* listed building. It is in classical style, and is unusual for the survival of a high proportion of the original internal fittings, including the pews, gallery, a pulpit (of two originally present) and glazing.

References

External links
 

Villages in Dorset
Hill forts in Dorset
Civil parishes in Dorset